Kitoko, born Patrick Bibarwa, is a Rwandan Afrobeats and hip-hop singer. He released his debut album, Ifaranga, in January 2010. The album enjoyed immediate and wide success in Rwanda and Uganda. In 2012 a reviewer for Ugandan newspaper The East African called him "the biggest Rwandan artiste at the moment". Prior to launching his musical career, Bibarwa sang in a local church choir.

In 2012, Kitoko was invited to give a private performance at the birthday of Ange Kagame, daughter of Rwandan president Paul Kagame. In February 2013, Kitoko performed at the Rwandan Cultural Festival in Jylland-Fyn, Denmark. He has also performed throughout the East African Community and in the United States, France and Belgium. He was a winner twice at the Salax Awards, including in the category of Best Afrobeat Artiste.

In June 2013, Kitoko announced his retirement from the music industry for unknown reasons.

Discography

Albums 
Kitoko Bibarwa

songs

References

Rwandan male singers
1985 births
Living people